This glossary of wildfire terms is a list of definitions of terms and concepts relevant to wildfires and wildland firefighting. Except where noted, terms have largely been sourced from a 1998 Fireline Handbook transcribed for a Conflict 21 counter-terrorism studies website by the Air National Guard.

For related terminology, see Glossary of firefighting terms and Glossary of firefighting equipment.

0–9

A

B

C

D

E

F

G

H

I

J

K

L

M

N

O

P

R

S

T

U

W

See also

Glossary of firefighting
Glossary of firefighting equipment
List of basic firefighting topics

References

Wildfires
Glossary
Wildfire ecology
Wildfire prevention
Wildfire
Wikipedia glossaries using description lists